is the lead singer of Japanese pop group Every Little Thing.

Biography 
Mochida began her career as a child actress, appearing in magazines and TV commercials. Shortly after, she released her first single as a solo artist, titled "Mō Ichido" in November 1993. She didn't decide to become a singer professionally until she was in high school.

In 1995, she met Mitsuru Igarashi, and signed to the Avex label. At first she was meant to debut as a solo artist, but as Max Matsuura suggested, she then formed a duo with Igarashi, and then a trio when Ichiro Ito was incorporated as a guitarist. They debuted in 1996 with "Feel My Heart". Following her debut with Every Little Thing, Mochida became a popular fashion icon in Japan, and started to appear in TV commercials for a wide variety of beauty products. The spots that she starred in usually used the songs of her band as background music. After the departure of Mitsuru Igarashi from Every Little Thing in 2000, Mochida started to take more control in the music making process, and soon started to write her own songs. The first song for Every Little Thing that she wrote lyrics for was "All along" included in the Time to Destination album, and the first song she composed was "Jump", released as a single in 2001.

She did not release any solo music until 2002, when she participated in the Avex charity project Song+Nation, where she recorded the song "In Case of Me", produced by Tetsuya Komuro. In 2004, she released "Itsunomanika Shōjo wa", a cover single of Yosui Inoue which was produced by the musician himself. In 2006, she wrote Haruka Ayase's debut single "Period" along with Takeshi Kobayashi, and in 2007, she wrote "Sarai no Kaze" for May and "Going Back Home" for Mika Nakashima. This year she also provided vocals for Dragon Ash's song "Wipe Your Eyes", song that also had a promotional video despite not being released as a single.

In 2009, Kaori Mochida's solo career officially started, and she started to work on her first solo album. She released her first official solo single, "Ame no Walts", on January 28, 2009. The song was credited as a collaboration between Mochida and Sakerock, a Japanese instrumental band. In March she and Takao Tajima from Original Love formed a special group called Caocao, and recorded a cover of "Kojin Jugyo" by Finger 5. The song was used as theme song for the movie Oppai Volleyball. In July she released a double A-side single entitled "Shizuka na Yoru/Weather", and a month later, on August 12, she released her first solo album, Moka. The album featured collaborations with several artists, such as Lisa Ono, Ikuko Harada, Yuichi Ohata, Bic Runga, ohashiTrio, and Sean Lennon. It debuted at number 9 in the Oricon charts and enjoyed moderated success.

On August 25, 2009, her second album, Niu, was released. The album had no commercial singles, except for a CD single of "Green", that was included in a special edition of fashion magazine Journal Standard. For this album she made her first domestic solo tour between September and October.

On August 1, 2012, her third solo album Manu a Manu was released. The song "Utsukushiki Uruwashiki Hibi", which was released as single from the album in June 2012, was used as theme song for TV Tokyo drama Cleopatra na Onna-tachi, which started airing in April of the same year.

Solo discography

Albums 
 Moka (2009)
 Niu (2010)
 Manu a Manu (2012)
 10 to 10 (2019)

Singles

Other appearances

Other works 
 Mochida provided vocals for the song "In Case of Me" on the 2002 charity album Song Nation. "In Case of Me" was written by Tetsuya Komuro and produced by Komuro and Max Matsuura.
 In 2006, Mochida along with Takeshi Kobayashi wrote the lyrics for the single  by Haruka Ayase.

References

External links 
 
 
 Nippop Profile|Every Little Thing

1978 births
20th-century Japanese composers
21st-century Japanese composers
Anime composers
Anime musicians
Avex Group artists
Every Little Thing (band) members
Japanese women composers
Japanese women musicians
Japanese women pop singers
Japanese women singer-songwriters
Japanese idols
Japanese child actresses
Living people
Singers from Tokyo
20th-century Japanese women singers
20th-century Japanese singers
21st-century Japanese women singers
21st-century Japanese singers
20th-century women composers
21st-century women composers